The Codex Zittaviensis (No. 664 in the Gregory-Aland numbering), δ 502 (von Soden), dedicated as Rahlfs 44, is a Greek minuscule manuscript of the Old Testament and New Testament, on paper. Palaeographically it has been assigned to the 15th century. The manuscript has complex contents. Gregory labelled it by 664e, 253a, 303p, and 106r. Scrivener labelled it by 605e, 233a, 243p, and 106r.

Description 

The codex contains the entire of the New Testament, on 233 paper leaves (size ).

The text is written in one column per page, 30 lines per page.

It contains also the text of the Old Testament (the whole codex has 775 leaves) with the books of 1 Esdras, 4 Maccabees, Judith, Tobit. The order of books: Old Testament (Genesis–Esther), Gospels, Book of Acts, Catholic epistles, Pauline epistles, and Apocalypse.

Text 

The Greek text of the codex is a representative of the Byzantine text-type. Hermann von Soden lists it to the textual family Kr. Kurt Aland placed it in Category V.

According to the Claremont Profile Method it belongs to the textual family Kr in Luke 1; 10; 20.

History 

Scrivener dated the manuscript to the 14th century, Gregory dated it to the 15th century. Currently the manuscript is dated by the INTF to the 15th century.

The manuscript once belonged to David Fleischmann († 1606), then to John Fleischmann, who in 1620 presented the manuscript to the Stadtbiliothek in Zittau.

It was examined and collated by Christian Frederick Matthaei in 1801-1802, but this collation had lost. Ernst von Dobschütz examined the manuscript. Gregory saw the manuscript in 1889.

The text of the Apocalypse was collated by Herman C. Hoskier.

Currently the manuscript is housed at the Stadtbibliothek (A 1), in Zittau.

See also 

 List of New Testament minuscules
 Biblical manuscript
 Textual criticism
 Minuscule 653

References

Further reading 
 Herman C. Hoskier, Concerning the Text of the Apocalypse: Collation of All Existing Available Greek Documents with the Standard Text of Stephen’s Third Edition Together with the Testimony of Versions, Commentaries and Fathers. vol. 1 (London: Bernard Quaritch, Ltd., 1929), pp. 330–337

Greek New Testament minuscules
Septuagint manuscripts
15th-century biblical manuscripts